The Wynn Newhouse Award is an annual prize given to disabled artists in recognition of their artistic merit.

History
The Samuel I. Newhouse Foundation, a charitable organization founded by newspaper entrepreneur Samuel Irving Newhouse, Sr., inaugurated the award in 2006 at the suggestion of the late Wynn Newhouse, to draw attention to the contributions of artists with disabilities to contemporary art. Wynn Newhouse, himself disabled, was a prominent New York City art collector and grandson of the newspaper magnate.

Recipients
Recipients share an annual award totaling $60,000, allocated by the judges. The selection committee changes each year. It is made up of four prominent members of the arts community including artists, curators and critics.

To be eligible for the Wynn Newhouse Awards, nominees must be artists of professional standing, and have a disability as recognized by the Americans with Disabilities Act of 1990. The awards are made in late December of each year.

In addition to the grants, many winning artists are offered an exhibition at the Palitz Gallery, a gallery space on East 61st Street in New York City. This exhibition is donated by Syracuse University in their Lubin Center in New York. An annual reception for winners attracts many persons in the arts community.  

The Wynn Newhouse Awards will be offered through 2020. They are currently coordinated by consultant Bill Butler of Alford, MA and by artist Gordon Sasaki of New York. Information can be obtained and artists can be
suggested via the website wnewhouseawards.com

Awards

Source: Wynn Newhouse

2006
 Riva Lehrer
 Terrence Karpowicz
 Jonathan Sarkin
 Darra Keeton
 Sunaura Taylor

2007
 Joseph Grigely
 Lihua Lei
 Harriet Sanderson
 Linda Sibio

2008
 Barbara Bloom
 Isabella Kirkland
 Stephen Lapthisophon
 Katie Miller

2009
 Tom Kovachevich
 Paul Laffoley
 Ralph Mindicino
 Edward Shalala

2010
 Willard Boepple
 Bill Shannon
 Tom Shannon
 Emily Eifler
 Emmet Estrada
 Doug Hilson
 Mamie Holst
 Ben Schonzeit

2011
 Barton Lidice Benes
 Mark Parsons
 Christine Sun Kim
 Sunaura Taylor
 Dawoud Bey
 John Fago
 Randy Gelber
 Corban Walker
 Peter Williams

2012
 Chuck Bowdish
 Laura Swanson
 Robin Antar
 Martin Cohen
 Laura Ferguson
 Alexis Mackenzie
 Katherine Sherwood
 Jennifer Lauren Smith

2013
 Carmen Papalia
Kendrick Rusty Shackleford
 Ken Grimes
 Christopher Knowles
 Jason Lazarus

2014
 Park McArthur	
 Carol Es	
 Marlon Mullen
 George Widener	
 Kerry Damianakes
 Willian Scott

2015
 Derrick Alexis Coard	
 Courttney Cooper	
 Nick Dupree
 Constantina Zavitsanos	
 Dan Miller
 Carolyn Lazard
 Alice Sheppard

2016
 Cathy Weis	
 Dustin Grella	
 E. Jane
 Jason DaSilva	
 Katya Tepper
Laura Craig McNellis
 Melvin Way
 Monica Chulewicz

2017
 Amy Stacey Curtis	
 BD White	
 Beverly Baker
 Gregory Blackstock	
 Helen Rae
 Myasia Dowdell
 Sky Cubacub
 Shannon Finnegan

2018
 Rachel Fein-Smolinski	
 Emilie Gossiaux	
 Kazumi Kamae
 Alma Leiva
 Jes Sachse
 Sandie Yi

2019
 Raquel Albarran
 Victorine Floyd Fludd
 Yo-Yo Lin
 Leroy Moore

2020
 Aurora Berger
 Robert Coombs (Artist)
 John Dugdale
 Kayla Hamiton
 Jerron Herman
 Michelle Miles
 Tony Pedemondt

References

External links
 About

Awards established in 2006
Visual arts awards